Statistics of Swiss Super League in the 1908–09 season.

East

Table

West

Table

Final

|colspan="3" style="background-color:#D0D0D0" align=center|6 June 1909

|}

Young Boys Bern won the championship.

Sources 
 Switzerland 1908-09 at RSSSF

Seasons in Swiss football
Swiss Football League seasons
1908–09 in Swiss football
Swiss